Mafi Kandi (also Romanized as Māfī Kandī) is a village in Koreh Soni Rural District, in the Central District of Salmas County, West Azerbaijan Province, Iran. At the 2006 census, its population was 840, in 145 families.

References 

Populated places in Salmas County